Tevfik Sırrı Gür Stadium is a sports center in Mersin, located at Mediterranean coast of Turkey. It is the former home of Mersin İdmanyurdu. The stadium is named after former popular governor of Mersin Province, Tevfik Sırrı Gür, who served between 1931-1947.

History
The stadium was inaugurated on 28 June 1958. In the opening game, Mersin İdmanyurdu drawn 3-3 with Galatasaray. In the first top level league match played in the stadium Mersin İdmanyurdu lost to Galatasaray by 1–2 on 10 September 1967, Sunday.

TFF Information
Information on Turkish Football Federation (TFF) page is as below:

General information
City: Mersin
Capacity: 10,128
Information:

Pitch
Pitch size: 68 x 105
Surface type: Grass
Lighting: Available

Stands
Seats :
Handicapped stand: Not available
Closed circuit camera system: Available

Last match
The last match played in the stadium was between Mersin İdmanyurdy SK and Adana Demirspor on 10 March 2014.

References

External links
Turkish Football Federation
Mersin İdmanyurdu S.K. Official Web Site
World Stadiums

Football venues in Turkey
Mersin İdman Yurdu
Sports venues completed in 1958
Sports venues in Mersin
2013 Mediterranean Games venues